There have been three NASCAR Busch Series races named Busch 200:

 Busch 200 (South Boston), run at South Boston Speedway from 1982 to 1989
 Busch 200 (Langley), run at Langley Field Speedway from 1984 to 1988
 Busch 200 (New Hampshire), run at New Hampshire International Speedway in 1999, 2000, and 2002